The Law Society is a body of students from Aligarh Muslim University's faculty of law. The body has produced lawyers, judges and politicians. It is an educational and representative body with an estimated 1000 active members. It is involved in training and preparing students for various competitive activities like Moot Court, Legal debate, Quiz, Judgment writing etc. of the Faculty. It was founded in 1894 as a non-profit student organization. It has long traditional character which always uplifts the students' participation and performance in relation to legal affairs in different arena. The Dean, Faculty of Law, Aligarh Muslim University, Aligarh is the President of the Society.

President
Dean, Faculty of Law, Aligarh Muslim University, Aligarh is the President of Law Society. Prof. Mohd. Ashraf is currently serving as the President of Law Society.

Post holders
Mohammad Shafi Qureshi former Governor of Uttar Pradesh was the secretary of the society in the year 1953.
Arif Jwadder was the secretary for the session 2013–14. Mr. Aqa Raza served as the Vice President of the Law Society in the academic session 2015-2016 and Editor of the Aligarh Law Society Review in the academic session 2014–2015. Anam Rais Khan was the secretary for the session 2014–15. Mr. Ali Faran Gulrez held the post of Editor of the Aligarh Law Society review in Law Society for the session 2017–18, which was published around after 45 years after 1971. Mr. Piyush Chawla has served as the vice-president for the session 2018–19, while Mr. Faham Ahmad Khan was the Secretary for the session 2018-19 Mr. Akash Varshney is currently serving as the Vice President for the session 2022-2023 and Mr. Shoaib Akhtar is serving as its Secretary.

Publications

AMU Law Society Review

The ‘AMU Law Society Review’ which is a wholly student reviewed Journal gets published by the editorial board, Law Society of the Faculty of Law, Aligarh Muslim University, every academic session. It is being published since the last 3 years.

AMU Law Society Newsletter

The editorial board, Law Society, AMU, aims to provide a detailed report of all the events which were held throughout the year in the faculty. It gives a platform to the students to express their experiences and opinions. The Newsletter also includes interviews from judges, academicians, reputed legal professionals and alumnus of our faculty. The main objective behind the Newsletter is to disseminate knowledge relating to contemporary legal issues.
AMU Law Society Newsletter was started in the year 2018 by Faran Gulrez and Abdullah Samdani. Since 2019, Prof. Tariq Mansoor, Hon'ble Vice Chancellor approved the publication of this Newsletter annually.
In the year 2020, the Newsletter was published under the guidance of Prof. Shakeel Ahmed Samdani, Dean, Faculty of Law and President, Law Society, Chief Editorship of Abdullah Samdani, Secretary, Law Society and Amber Tanweer, Editor, AMU Law Society Review.

Programmes

The Society for the first time organised annual festival named 1st Gavel's Buzz in the year 2014. The 2nd Gavel's Buzz was organised in the year 2016. The 3rd Gavel's Buzz was organised on 2017. Justice Markandey Katju visited the Law Society recently.

Law Society 2019-20

International Events

1. In 2020, the law society got the credit of organising the first International Conference in the history of the law faculty. On 12 July 2020 the law society organised an its first national conference on the topic "Globalisation of Justice through Alternate Dispute Resolution". Experts from four countries delivered their lectures, namely, Mr. Jeff Kichaven from the United States, Mr. Gustavo Milare Almeida from Brazil, Mr. Fahmi Shahab from Indonesia, and Ms. Iram Majid from India. This conference was inaugurated by Prof. Tariq Mansoor, Vice Chancellor, Aligarh Muslim University and was presided by Prof Shakeel Ahmed Samdani, Dean, Faculty of Law, Aligarh Muslim University. Mr. Abdullah Samdani, Secretary, Law Society 2019-20 moderated this conference.

2. Second International Virtual Conference was also organised by the law society on the topic "Civil Society and Contemporary Legal Issues" on 26 July 2020. International experts from four countries delivered their presentations, namely, Dr Mario Boris Curatolo (Spain), Dr Ferdinand Epoc (Philippines), Dr Ermal Bino (Republic of North Macedonia), and Dr. Shad Ahmad Khan (Oman). This conference was inaugurated by Prof. Tariq Mansoor, Vice Chancellor, Aligarh Muslim University and was presided by Prof Shakeel Ahmed Samdani, Dean, Faculty of Law, Aligarh Muslim University. Mr. Abdullah Samdani, Secretary, Law Society 2019-20 moderated this conference.

3. Third International Virtual Conference was also organised by the law society on the topic "International Health Laws During COVID-19: A Perspective" on 12 August 2020. International experts from two countries delivered their presentations, namely, Dr Julie Lord and Dr Aruj Qayum (United Kingdom) and Dr Abdul R Moodambail (Qatar). This conference was inaugurated by Prof. Tariq Mansoor, Vice Chancellor, Aligarh Muslim University and was presided by Prof Shakeel Ahmed Samdani, Dean, Faculty of Law. Mr. Abdullah Samdani, Secretary, Law Society 2019-20 and Dr Gaurav introduced the guests.

4. Fourth International Virtual Conference was organised by the law society on the topic "Women Empowerment, Gender Justice and Role of International Law" on 28 August 2020. International experts from three countries delivered their presentations, namely, Ms Wafa Rashid Al Alyani (Oman), Prof Namrata Pradhan (Bhutan) and Dr Sadaf Khan (Saudi Arabia). This conference was inaugurated by Prof. Tariq Mansoor, Vice Chancellor, Aligarh Muslim University and was presided by Prof Shakeel Ahmed Samdani, Dean, Faculty of Law, Aligarh Muslim University. Mr. Abdullah Samdani, Secretary, Law Society 2019-20 moderated this conference.

5. Fifth International Virtual Conference was organised by the law society on the topic "Imbibing Professional Skills Among Law Practitioners" on 13 September 2020. International experts from three countries delivered their presentations, namely, Mr. Habibul Islam (Bangladesh), Dr. Anna C. Bocar (Philippines) and Ms Shrijana Rai (Bhutan). This conference was presided by Prof. Shakeel Ahmed Samdani, Dean, Faculty of Law and President, Law Society. Mr. Abdullah Samdani, Secretary, Law Society moderated this event.

6. Sixth International Virtual Conference was organised by the law society on the topic "Becoming Global Citizen – Skills and Approach" on 26 September 2020. International experts from three countries their presentations, namely, Ms. Shefali Raj (India), Dr. Prabha Thoudham (Oman) and Mr. Subhajit Sanyal (Nepal). The conference director and Dean, Faculty of Law, Prof. Shakeel Ahmed Samdani also addressed the participants. Mr. Abdullah Samdani, Secretary, Law Society welcomed the guests.

7. Seventh International Virtual Conference was organised by the law society on the topic "Sir Syed : Vision and Mission" on 10 October 2020. International experts from three different countries, namely, Er. Nadeem Tarin (Saudi Arabia), Dr. Latifa Ben Arfa Rabai (Oman), Mr. S. Gurdev Singh (India) and Prof. Shafey Kidwai (India) addressed the participants virtually. The conference director and Dean, Faculty of Law, Prof. Shakeel Ahmed Samdani also addressed the participants. Mr. Abdullah Samdani, Secretary, Law Society welcomed the guests.

National Events

Webinars

During the COVID-19 pandemic the Faculty of Law, Aligarh Muslim University was closed but the Law Society continued its activities through online mode. 3 National webinars were conducted under the banner of law society.

1. "Role of Young Lawyers in Alternate Dispute Resolution" by Ms Iram Majid, Director, Indian Institute of Arbitration and Mediation. The webinar was presided by the Prof. Shakeel Ahmed Samdani, Dean, Faculty of Law, Aligarh Muslim University and President, Law Society and was moderated by Mr. Abdullah Samdani, Secretary, Law Society, AMU.

2. "Working of Competition Commission in India: An Overview" by Mr. Anand Vikas Mishra, Joint Director (Law), Competition Commission of India. The webinar was presided by the Prof. Mohd Shakeel Ahmed Samdani, Dean, Faculty of Law, Aligarh Muslim University and President, Law Society and was moderated by Mr. Abdullah Samdani, Secretary, Law Society, AMU.

3. "Law Relating to Bail in India: An Analysis and Overview" by Adv. Shariq Ahmed, Advocate, Supreme Court of India. The webinar was presided by the Prof. Mohd Shakeel Ahmed Samdani, Dean, Faculty of Law, Aligarh Muslim University and President, Law Society and was moderated by Mr. Abdullah Samdani, Secretary, Law Society, AMU.

4. "Legal Philosophy of Sir Muhammad Iqbal (Allama Iqbal)''" was a national level webinar in which Prof. Abdul Haq, Professor Emeritus, University of Delhi, Delhi, India was the Chief Guest. Prof. Shakeel Ahmed Samdani, Dean, [Faculty of Law, Aligarh Muslim University] and President, Law Society, AMU presided over the conference. Prof. Saud Alam Qasmi and Ms. Ayesha Samdani also delivered their speeches. Mr. Abdullah Samdani, Secretary, Law Society proposed the vote of thanks and Ms. Ayesha Nasir Alavi moderated this event.

5. "Constitutional Day Celebrations" was a national level webinar which was conducted by Law Society. The topic of the webinar was "Interface between Fundamental Rights and Fundamental Duties". Prof. Manoj Kumar Sinha, Director, Indian Law Institute, New Delhi was the Chief Guest and the webinar was Presided by Prof. Shakeel Ahmed Samdani, Dean, Faculty of Law and President, Law Society.

Online Events'

1. Online Essay Writing Competition was conducted on national level by the Law Society 2019–20.

2. All India Independence Day Quiz Competition was conducted by the Law Society 2019-20 via online mode.

3. All India Independence Day Essay Writing Competition was conducted by the Law Society 2019-20 via online mode.

See also
Aligarh Muslim University
Faculty of Law, Aligarh Muslim University

References

Aligarh Muslim University
1894 establishments in India
Educational institutions established in 1894